LMS Stanier Class 5 4-6-0 number 5000 is a preserved British steam locomotive.  It is part of the National Railway Collection.

Service 
5000 was built at Crewe in 1935 and was initially the first numerically of its class. It however was not the first to be built because the Vulcan Foundry had turned out the first of their simultaneous order, No. 5020 in 1934. It also ceased to be the first numerically when No. 4800 was built in 1944, after the LMS ran out of available numbers after No. 5499 was built.

5000 was built with a low degree superheat domeless boiler.

5000 had 40000 added to its number to become 45000 after nationalisation in 1948 by British Railways.

Preservation 
After withdrawal from Lostock Hall shed, near Preston in 1967, 5000 was selected to represent its 842-strong class as part of the National Railway Collection. Part of the reason for this was that it had a domeless boiler and was roughly in the condition as built. It was therefore painted in its original LMS lined black livery. However, there had been changes over its lifetime and as a result there are numerous detail differences between 5000 as built and 5000 as preserved.

5000 was steamed on the Severn Valley Railway and on the mainline in preservation. In 1980, 5000 attended The Rocket 150 celebrations at Rainhill, where she hauled a short mixed goods which included 2 flatwagons carrying a replica of the engine Novelty, & The Earl from the Welshpool and Llanfair Railway, which at the time was on loan to the NRM before returning to Welshpool by the late 1990s. Since its boiler certificate expired in 1990, it has been restricted to being a static exhibit and  it is on display at the Shildon Locomotion Museum in County Durham.

References

External links 

 Railuk database

45000
Preserved London, Midland and Scottish Railway steam locomotives
Individual locomotives of Great Britain
Railway locomotives introduced in 1935
Standard gauge steam locomotives of Great Britain